The National Bank of Commerce Building in Kansas City, Missouri is a building in the Classical Revival architecture. It was listed on the National Register of Historic Places in 1993.

References

Commercial buildings completed in 1908
Skyscraper office buildings in Kansas City, Missouri
Bank buildings on the National Register of Historic Places in Missouri
National Register of Historic Places in Kansas City, Missouri
1908 establishments in Missouri
Downtown Kansas City